Emilia sonchifolia, also known as lilac tasselflower or cupid's shaving brush, is tropical flowering species of tasselflower in the sunflower family. It is widespread in tropical regions around the world, apparently native to Asia (China, India, Southeast Asia, etc.) and naturalized in Africa, Australia, the Americas, and various oceanic islands.

One plant can produce several pink or purplish flower heads.

The plant is erect and sparingly hairy, soft-stemmed, and grows to 20 to 70 cm high with a branch tap root. The leaf pattern is alternate with winged petioles. Leaves on the lower end of the stem are round/oval shape, 4 to 16 cm in height, and 1 to 8 cm in width. The leaves on the upper end of the stem are smaller than the leaves on the lower end of the stem and are often coarsely toothed.

The inflorescence is often dichotomous, with 3 to 6 stalked flower heads and whorled bracts below. The urn-shaped flower head has 30-60 florets per head, the outer ray florets are female, and the inner disc florets are bisexual. The flower is any of a range of colors: purple, scarlet, red, pink, orange, white, or lilac. The fruit produced is oval shaped, reddish brown or off-white, has white hairs up to 8 mm long, and exhibits dry indehiscent properties.

Biology and ecology
Emilia sonchifolia completes its life cycle in approximately 90 days. There are two types of seed, which are defined by the color of the achene. The first, a female outer circle of florets of a flower head produces red and brown achenes. The second is the inner, off-white hermaphrodite florets. Most seeds germinate at 27 °C but those that develop from outer florets germinate under deep shade. Plants only emerge from seeds near the surface, however, some seed can germinate (4%) while buried deep (4 cm). The seed carries a pappus of hairs, indicating the use of wind as a dispersal agent.

Impact
Emilia sonchifolia is commonly reported as a weed crop. In most areas, it is reported as noninvasive, however, in some cotton producing areas, it is classified as the most problematic weeds.

It has certain effects on individual crops, such as decreases in weight of lettuce(by 70%) and mustard cabbage(by 30%), and a decreased yield of tomato fruit by 18%.

The pathogens associated with Emilia sonchifolia also have effects on certain crops. Emilia sonchifolia is a host of Xanthomonas campestris, which causes a bacterial infection in beans in Brazil and Cuba.

Habitat
Emilia sonchifolia can grow anywhere from sea level to 1000 meters. It exists over a wide range of conditions from the tropics to grasslands, waste areas, roadsides, and partially shaded areas. It is tolerant of acid conditions.

Medicinal uses
It is a medicinal herb in Chinese, called ye xia hong. It is one among the "Ten Sacred Flowers of Kerala State in India, collectively known as Dasapushpam. In Vietnam, it has been used in traditional medicine for the treatment of fever, sore throat, diarrhea, eczema and as an antidote for snake bites.

The leaves and young shoots can be used, raw or cooked. The leaves are harvested before the plant flowers.

The young leaves are used as food in Java and Puerto Rico, however, in India and China, it is used medicinally.

Weed management
Emilia sonchifolia is classified as a weed that grows in the fields of many agriculture crops, but it can be controlled via the use of certain chemicals. For example, in rice, a mixture of pretilachlor and dimethametryn, and a mixture of piperophos with propanil or oxidiazon, are added to the soil after sowing, resulting in 8–12 weeks of growth control against Emilia sonchifolia. In soybean fields, a mixture of bentazone, fomensafen and sethoxydim is used to control Emilia sonchifolia growth. In cotton and soybean fields, sethoxydim is the chemical agent used to control Emilia sonchifolia growth. Lastly, atrazine is the chemical agent used to control the growth of Emilia sonchifolia in sugarcane crops.

Toxicity
Emilia sonchifolia contains tumorigenic pyrrolizidine alkaloids, causing hepatotoxicity.

Gallery

References

External links

Senecioneae
Plants described in 1753
Taxa named by Carl Linnaeus
Flora of Asia
Plants used in traditional Chinese medicine